Euglyphis ampira is a species of moth of the family Lasiocampidae first described by Herbert Druce in 1890. It is found in Ecuador.

References

Moths described in 1890
Lasiocampidae
Moths of South America